Samantha Schultz ( Achterberg, born March 27, 1992) is an American modern pentathlete. She won the silver medal in the women's individual event at the 2019 Pan American Games held in Lima, Peru. Achterberg and Jessica Davis also won the gold medal in the women's relay event.

In 2015, she competed in the women's individual event at the Pan American Games held in Toronto, Canada without winning a medal. In 2016, she competed at the World Modern Pentathlon Championships held in Moscow, Russia.

She represented the United States at the 2020 Summer Olympics in Tokyo, Japan. She competed in the women's event.

She is a sergeant in the United States Army Reserves.

References

External links

Living people
1992 births
Place of birth missing (living people)
American female modern pentathletes
American military Olympians
Pan American Games medalists in modern pentathlon
Pan American Games gold medalists for the United States
Pan American Games silver medalists for the United States
Modern pentathletes at the 2015 Pan American Games
Modern pentathletes at the 2019 Pan American Games
Medalists at the 2019 Pan American Games
Modern pentathletes at the 2020 Summer Olympics
Olympic modern pentathletes of the United States
United States Army non-commissioned officers
United States Army reservists
21st-century American women